Mickey Fisher (born December 22, 1940—December 22, 2021) is a Canadian politician, who served in the Legislative Assembly of Yukon from 1992 to 1996. He represented the electoral district of Lake Laberge as a member of the Yukon Party.

First elected in the 1992 election, he served in the cabinet of John Ostashek as Minister of Renewable Resources. He was defeated in the 1996 election by Doug Livingston of the Yukon New Democratic Party, by a margin of just three votes.

References

1940 births
Living people
Politicians from Whitehorse
Yukon Party MLAs